Scopula annularia is a moth of the family Geometridae first described by Charles Swinhoe in 1890. It is found from the north-eastern Himalayas to Hong Kong, Myanmar, Sumatra, Borneo, Java, the Philippines, Sulawesi and Seram.

Subspecies
Scopula annularia annularia (Myanmar, ...)
Scopula annularia reducta Rothschild, 1920 (Sumatra, ...)

References

Moths described in 1890
annularia
Moths of Asia